Banana cue or bananacue is a popular snack food or street food in the Philippines. It is a portmanteau of banana and barbecue, which in Philippine English refers to meat cooked in a style similar to satay.

Description
Banana cue is made with deep fried bananas coated in caramelized brown sugar. The bananas used for this recipe are Saba bananas, which are very commonly used for cooking in the Philippines. It is usually skewered on a bamboo stick, and sold on the streets. The skewer stick is just for ease of serving and eating, but the dish is not cooked on the skewer (as opposed to ginanggang).

See also

 Camote cue
 Ginanggang
 List of banana dishes
 Maruya
 Pinasugbo
 Pisang goreng
 Pritong saging
 Turon

References

Banana dishes
Deep fried foods
Philippine desserts
Snack foods
Street food in the Philippines